Hisarya Cove is the 950 m wide cove on the northwest side of Osmar Strait indenting for 500 m the southeast coast of Smith Island in the South Shetland Islands, Antarctica south of Dupnitsa Point and 7.6 km northeast of Cape James. Its head is fed by Letnitsa Glacier.  Bulgarian early mapping in 2009.

The cove is named after the town of Hisarya in southern Bulgaria.

Maps
Chart of South Shetland including Coronation Island, &c. from the exploration of the sloop Dove in the years 1821 and 1822 by George Powell Commander of the same. Scale ca. 1:200000. London: Laurie, 1822.
  L.L. Ivanov. Antarctica: Livingston Island and Greenwich, Robert, Snow and Smith Islands. Scale 1:120000 topographic map. Troyan: Manfred Wörner Foundation, 2010.  (First edition 2009. )
 South Shetland Islands: Smith and Low Islands. Scale 1:150000 topographic map No. 13677. British Antarctic Survey, 2009.
 Antarctic Digital Database (ADD). Scale 1:250000 topographic map of Antarctica. Scientific Committee on Antarctic Research (SCAR). Since 1993, regularly upgraded and updated.
 L.L. Ivanov. Antarctica: Livingston Island and Smith Island. Scale 1:100000 topographic map. Manfred Wörner Foundation, 2017.

References
 Hisarya Cove. SCAR Composite Antarctic Gazetteer
 Bulgarian Antarctic Gazetteer. Antarctic Place-names Commission. (details in Bulgarian, basic data in English)

External links
 Hisarya Cove. Copernix satellite image

Coves of Smith Island (South Shetland Islands)
Bulgaria and the Antarctic